North Valley High School is a public high school located in Grants Pass, Oregon, United States.

Academics
In 2008, 60% of the school's seniors received their high school diploma. Of 172 students, 104 graduated, 53 dropped out, 1 received a modified diploma, and 14 are still in high school. Notable graduates include Michael Thomas McCullough, actor, technological entrepreneur, Stanford graduate and Olympian Matt Gentry.

Athletics
Since opening in 1977, North Valley has won eight Oregon State championships, including the Triple Crown (boys' football, basketball, and baseball) in the 1984–1985 school year. The girls' Cheerleading squad also won the OSAA Cheerleading Championship in the same school year. In 2012 Ryan Melnychuk won the individual OSAA Golf State Championships with a score of 3 under, he also broke an opening round scoring record with a 67. In 2013 Boys' Basketball won the Oregon state championship tournament with a record of 27-0 becoming the only team in Oregon to go undefeated and win the State Championship that year.  The 2016 Girls' Soccer team won the 4A Oregon State Championship completing an 18-0-0 undefeated season.
 Football: 1984
 Boys' Basketball : 1985, 2013
 Baseball: 1985
 Boys' Track & Field : 1991
 Cheerleading: 1984, 1985, 1993, 1996
Golf: 2012
Girls Track and Field State Champions: 2014
Girls Soccer Undefeated State Champions: 2016
Girls Soccer Skyline Conference Champions: 2015, 2016, 2017, 2018 (Co-Champion), 2019

References

High schools in Josephine County, Oregon
Educational institutions established in 1977
Grants Pass, Oregon
Public high schools in Oregon
1977 establishments in Oregon